The Gagah Samudera  is a class of training ships of the Royal Malaysian Navy (RMN). The two ships were built jointly by Malaysia and South Korea under a shared development programme, with one ship built in South Korea and the other in Malaysia,  The ships, named KD Gagah Samudera and KD Teguh Samudera are currently in service with Royal Malaysian Navy.  All RMN ships carry the prefix KD (Malay: Kapal Di-Raja, literally "Royal Ship")

Both are 76 meters long, have a helicopter deck and are capable of operating up to 2,500 nautical miles for up to 21 days. The ships are equipped with modern air and surface search radar, navigational radar, combat system and communications.

Role
Both ships are currently used for training and are able to accommodate up to 60 trainees, including separate quarters for up to 12 females and both ships can conduct limited combat operation beside their primary training role.

Armament
The class is armed with a DS30B 30mm cannon and two Browning .50 calibre machine guns. They both have the for but not with concept where missiles and torpedoes such as the Rolling Airframe, Surface-to-air missile, Exocet MM40, Anti-ship missile and Triple torpedo launchers may be installed when required. For aviation, both ships are able to accommodate a medium-size helicopter for anti-surface and anti-submarine duties. Due to these capabilities, the ships may also be used as a patrol boat.

Ship of the class

References

Patrol vessels of the Royal Malaysian Navy
Ships built in Malaysia
Ships built in South Korea
Auxiliary training ship classes
Training ships of the Royal Malaysian Navy